Andrew David Marsh,  is a senior British police officer. He has been chief executive officer of the College of Policing since September 2021.

From February 2016 to July 2021, he was chief constable of Avon and Somerset Police, having previously been chief constable of Hampshire Constabulary.

His policing career commenced as a recruit at Avon and Somerset in 1987. He later became assistant chief constable (ACC) for Wiltshire Police, then ACC for Avon and Somerset, then deputy chief constable of Hampshire.

Honours

References

Living people
British Chief Constables
Year of birth missing (living people)
English recipients of the Queen's Police Medal